Pataudi Road railway station is a major railway station in Gurgaon district, Haryana. Its code is PTRD. It serves Pataudi city. The station consists of three platforms. The platforms are not well sheltered. It lacks many facilities including water and sanitation. The station is connects Pataudi town to Delhi and Gurgaon and other important cities in India like Mumbai, Kolkata, Ahmadabad, Ajmer, Jaisalmer, Bhagat Ki Kothi, Jaipur as well as near by areas. The station located on 4 km from Pataudi.

Major trains

Some of the important trains that runs from Pataudi Road are :

 Ranikhet Express
 Ala Hazrat Express (via Ahmedabad)
 Ashram Express
 Ala Hazrat Express (via Bhildi)
 Bhagat Ki Kothi–Delhi Sarai Rohilla Express
 Corbett Park Link Express
 Delhi–Barmer Link Express
 Delhi–Rewari Passenger
 Jodhpur–Delhi Sarai Rohilla Superfast Express
 Malani Express
 Mandore Express
 Meerut Cantt.–Rewari Passenger 
 Rewari–Delhi Sarai Rohilla Passenger
 Chetak Express
 Tilak Bridge–Rewari Junction Passenger
 Yoga Express

References

Railway stations in Gurgaon district
Delhi railway division